Football Club Caspiy (Kaspıı Aqtau Futbol Kluby) is a Kazakhstani football club based at the Zhastar Stadium in Aktau. The club name derived from Caspian Sea. Their best year was 1996, when they finished 4th in the Premier League and reached the semi-finals of the Kazakhstan Cup. Since 2001, they were stuck in the First Division, until gaining direct promotion to the top division in the 2019 season.

History
From 1979 – 1991, the team played in the Soviet second league. From 1992 onwards, following the breakup of the Soviet Union, they played in the championship of Kazakhstan. The best achievement – the 4th place in 1996.

Premier league return
Caspiy returned to the Kazakhstan Premier League for the first time in 19 seasons in 2020, with Head Coach Srdjan Blagojevic guiding them to a 10th-place finish. The following season, 2021, Blagojevic sealed an 8th-place finish before leaving to join Astana, with Nikolay Kostov being appointed as his replacement on 31 December 2021.

Names
1962 : Founded as Trud
1990 : The club is renamed Aktau
1993 (July) : The club is renamed Munaishy
1999 : The club is renamed Aktau
2000 : The club is renamed Mangystau
2002 : The club is renamed Caspiy

Domestic history

Current squad

Honours
Kazakhstan First Division (1): 1994
Kazakh SSR Top League (1): 1978
Kazakh SSR Cup (3): 1964, 1977, 1978

References

External links
fccaspy.kz  Official site

 
Caspiy
Aktau
1962 establishments in the Kazakh Soviet Socialist Republic